A seasonal beer is a beer that is typically brewed during or for a particular season, holiday or festival period. Many breweries and microbreweries produce seasonal beers. Seasonal beers may be produced when fresh ingredients are available during various seasons, per climatic conditions during the time of the year, and also as a tradition. Furthermore, seasonal beer is produced based upon seasons, holidays, festivals and events.

By season

Spring

Lambic has been described as a seasonal beer that is prepared during the winter for consumption in spring and summer months. Traditionally, the preparation of lambic includes leaving the wort mixture outside overnight to absorb wild yeasts in the air. It is also prepared with beer yeast for fermentation and bacteria such as lactobacillus and acetobacter for aging, after which time during the warmer spring and summer seasons, the wild yeasts and souring bacteria in the mix predominantly influence the final product's flavor and characteristics. They are aged in wooden barrels or stainless steel tanks. Lambics are typically liberally hopped as a preservative to control bacteria levels, however the hops are usually aged as to not add too much bitterness. Some varieties are aged for years. They typically have a slight sweetness, along with a distinct sourness.

Summer

Summer seasonal beers are typically formulated for warmer weather, and are typically light-bodied. They may have citrus or fruity flavor, which may be accented with the use of honey, brewing spices and floral hops. Many summer seasonal beers are ales and wheat ales.

Saison (literally the French translation of season) has been described as a summer seasonal beer. As a beer style, the saison originated from ales brewed during the cooler and less active months in farmhouses in Wallonia, the French-speaking region of Belgium, and then stored for drinking by the farm workers during the summer months. General characteristics include a fruity flavor and smell, light or bitter hoppiness, pale orange body, thick head, and a light- to medium-body.

Autumn
Autumn seasonal beers may incorporate the use of spices such as cinnamon and nutmeg, which serves to associate the season with the beer's flavor, or to create a "frame of reference unique to that season".

In Germany and the United States, Oktoberfestbier or Märzen, originally produced for the Oktoberfest celebrations held in Munich, are commonly released throughout September and October. Beers served at modern Oktoberfests tend to be lighter lagers, while traditional recipes are amber-colored, dry, and malty.

Bière de Garde (English: "beer for keeping") is a seasonal beer that is traditionally brewed in the Nord-Pas-de-Calais region of France. It is brewed in Autumn, after which it is stored during the winter, to be consumed during the next year. Bière de Garde was originally brewed in farmhouses in the Nord-Pas-de-Calais region. Varieties of Bière de Garde are produced by some American craft brewers. Some of these American varieties have a high alcohol by volume content, ranging from 7-9%.

Pumpkin ale is often brewed as an autumn seasonal beer. Well-known examples include Saint Arnold's Pumpkinator, Shipyard's Pumpkinhead, and Schlafly's Pumpkin Ale.

Winter

Bock was traditionally produced during winter for consumption during either winter or Lent and Easter festivals in the spring.

Winter warmers are a type of winter seasonal beer. These include old ales and mild ales that have been brewed during the winter months. Prior to the times of the Industrial Revolution in the mid-eighteenth century in England, some winter warmers were aged in barrels for months, and even years, which added to their flavor profile. The barrels were typically made from oak. During this time, tannins from the wooden barrels served to add flavor notes to winter warmers, and wild yeasts added a mild sour flavor. Winter warmers also sometimes have spices added for additional flavor and tend to be full-bodied, darker, and malt-driven styles.

Wassail-style beer is sometimes described or categorized as a winter warmer.

By holiday
Seasonal beers produced for Thanksgiving and Christmas include pumpkin ale and gingerbread-flavored beer. Holiday spiced beers may also be brewed with orange zest to add flavor.

Christmas beer

Christmas beer is seasonal beer brewed for consumption during Christmas or the winter in a number of countries. Some varieties of Christmas beer may be strong and spiced with a variety of unusual ingredients. Spices used in Christmas beer varieties includes allspice, cardamom, cinnamon, clove, nutmeg and star anise. Christmas beers are sometimes referred to as winter warmers.

The style of beer dates back to at least 2,000 years, when it was produced to celebrate the Saturnalia during winter. This tradition was carried on through and beyond the Middle Ages by monks who would produce beer for the Christmas season.

By festival

Oktoberfest

Some seasonal beers are produced for the Oktoberfest festival. Oktoberfest seasonal beers include those named and labeled as "Oktoberfest" (e.g. Oktoberfestbiers), ales, spiced ales, pumpkin ales, and others. Oktoberfestbiers are the beers that have been served at the festival since 1818, and are supplied by six breweries: Spaten, Löwenbräu, Augustiner-Bräu, Hofbräu-München, Paulaner and Hacker-Pschorr.

See also
 Experimental beer
 List of beer styles

References

Bibliography

Further reading
 

Types of beer